The Canal Street Ferry, also known as the Algiers Ferry,  is a ferry across the Mississippi River in the U.S. state of Louisiana, connecting the foot of Canal Street in the Central Business District of New Orleans with Algiers on the West Bank. It carries pedestrians only for $2.00 one way. This increase in price from (formerly) free took effect February 23, 2014. The Crescent City Connection Division of the Louisiana Department of Transportation and Development operates the ferry.  Ferries depart daily from the West Bank on the hour and half hour, beginning at 6 a.m. (06:00) Departures from the East Bank are on the quarter-hour and three quarters hour, the last leaving at 12:15 a.m. (00:15).

History
The Ferry has been in regular service since 1827.

After Hurricane Katrina (2005) the ferry's schedule was changed, ending daily service at 8 p.m. (20:00) Urged by the New Orleans City Council and special interest groups, such as the citizens group Friends of the Ferry, the state extended hours again in August 2007.

In 2009, the Jackson Avenue–Gretna ferry also operated through the Canal Street landing.

The Ferry in the film Déjà Vu
The Ferry figures prominently in the 2006 film Déjà Vu.  A major plot point in the film involves a fictional terrorist attack on the Ferry.  Pyrotechnics and special effects simulated one of the ferry boats being blown up.

Some aspects of the depiction of the Ferry in the film are contrary to real life. Notably in the film people driving on to the Ferry are required to leave their cars and go to the upper level during transit. In real life there is no such restriction; people may step out of their vehicles or remain inside them. Also, letters marking the two terminals "CANAL ST" and "ALGIERS" were temporarily erected on the terminal roofs during filming.

See also
List of crossings of the Lower Mississippi River

References

External links

Crescent City Connection Ferries
Louisiana Department of Transportation and Development, Locations and Characteristics of Ferries
Ferry webcam on nola.com
Friends of the Ferry

Ferries of the Mississippi River
Transportation in New Orleans
Ferries of Louisiana